Palau competed at the 2008 Summer Olympics in Beijing, China. Palau's Olympic delegation was led by Frank Kyota, the President of the Palau National Olympic Committee, and consisted of five athletes, three team officials and four coaches. This was an increase from the nation's two previous appearances at the Summer Olympic Games; four athletes had been sent to both the Sydney and Athens Games. Palau's Olympic team was one of the 117 that won no medals at the Games.

Opening & closing ceremonies 
Palau was the 119th national team to enter the Beijing National Stadium in the parade of nations during the Opening Ceremony. The country's flag bearer was freestyle wrestler Elgin Loren Elwais, the first Palauan athlete to have qualified for a Games based on his own performances.

At the Closing Ceremony athletes entered in a less formal style, led by the flag bearers of all the competing nations. The Palauan flag was carried by swimmer Amber Yobech.

Athletics

Palau had two competitors in the sport of athletics, one in each of the men's and women's 100 m sprints. Jesse Tamangrow finished seventh out of eight competitors in a heat which included eventual bronze medallist Walter Dix. Despite setting a new personal best time of 11.38 seconds he did not advance to the quarterfinals of the competition. In the women's event Peoria Koshiba finished eighth out of nine athletes in the first heat and did not advance to the next round.

Men

Women

Swimming

Amber Yobech, the youngest member of the team at age 17, was the sole Palauan representative in the swimming events. She finished 3rd in her heat and 71st out of the 92 competitors overall.

Women

Qualifiers for the latter rounds of all swimming events at the Games were decided on a time only basis between competitors from all heats, therefore the rank shown is an overall position against every swimmer in the round.

Wrestling

Two wrestlers represented Palau in Beijing. Both athletes received byes in the first round but were defeated in their respective round of 16 matches. Elgin Loren Elwais, the reigning Oceanic champion, was beaten on points by three times world champion Hamid Soryan in the Greco-Roman 55 kg. After the bout he announced his hope of competing at the 2012 Olympics in London, saying, "It is my first Olympics and I am looking forward to my next because I'm young." The other wrestler Florian Skilang Temengil was beaten by Hungarian Ottó Aubéli in the Freestyle 120 kg.

Men's freestyle

Men's Greco-Roman

Media coverage
The 2008 Summer Olympics marked the first time that Palauans were able to watch complete Olympic television coverage of all events in their own country. Palau's in-depth television coverage was due to a special agreement between TV New Zealand and the Palau National Communications Corporation.

References 

Nations at the 2008 Summer Olympics
2008
Olymp